The Litell Rocks are an area of rock outcrops within the lower Rennick Glacier, Antarctica, located  east of the north end of the Morozumi Range. They were mapped by the United States Geological Survey from ground surveys and U.S. Navy air photos, 1960–62, and were named by the Advisory Committee on Antarctic Names for Richard J. Litell, a public information officer with the National Science Foundation, who served in four summer seasons in Antarctica, 1960–64.

References

Rock formations of Victoria Land
Pennell Coast